Louisville Stoneware, previously known as Louisville Pottery, is located in the Highlands section of Louisville, Kentucky.  Founded in 1815, making it one of the oldest stoneware companies in the United States, it creates fanciful stoneware that is nationally renowned.  It specializes in decorating its pottery with Kentucky Derby and Christmas themes, but it has other themes as well: Noah's Ark, Primrose, and Pear being examples.  They can also create personalized items.  Besides pottery, they have made bird baths and bird feeders.

History 

The JB Taylor Company was founded in 1815 in Louisville, Kentucky. But it was not owned by John B. Taylor until 1938. In 1970 the company was sold and became known as Louisville Stoneware. The company still produces the stoneware. Some of the old patterns are still in production as well as many new designs.

Some of the oldest patterns include Harvest and Vintage. In the earlier days, the artists were likely to experiment with different designs and you can occasionally find a unique treasure in antique/consignment shops. They also do many pieces on commission for company/event promotions, the best known being their pieces done to commemorate the running of the Kentucky Derby. They also did a pattern for Cracker Barrel Restaurants, Kentucky Fried Chicken and many more.

The fun aspect of this stoneware is the different patterns and individual hand painted designs, such as Bachelor Button, Country Flowers, hummingbirds, 12 Days of Christmas, and Noah's Ark, as well as some decorative pieces including castles, birdhouses, pet dishes, etc.

One of the better known potters to work for John B. Taylor was MA Hadley (Mary Alice Hadley), who started a company of her own. MA Hadley is very collectible and highly sought after for their varied and creative hand painted patterns. 

Hadley Pottery had its inception early in 1940. At that time, M.A.Hadley applied her artistic talents to the making of a custom set of dishes for a cruiser that the Hadleys had on the Ohio River. The Hadley Pottery building was purchased by the Hadley's in October 1944 as a birthday present for Mrs. Hadley. Mrs. Hadley painted all of the murals on the walls of the building.

Since 1997, company sales have averaged $3 million a year.  In those ten years, the business switched from a mostly wholesale business to mostly retail.  Over 90% of their business has been centered around Louisville and Kentucky, but internet and national advertising is expected to expand distribution.

In March 2007, Louisville Stoneware laid off most of its employees (38 out of 49), after which they retooled their visitor's center and temporarily opened a store at Oxmoor Center in St. Matthews, Kentucky.  In July, it was sold to Two Stone Inc., as the previous owner, Christina Lee Brown, wished to retire.  The chief concept officer, Lisa Mullins, decided to increase the number of places that sold their stoneware from just one, Taste of Kentucky, to three additional locations in Louisville, and one apiece in Bardstown, Kentucky, Owensboro, Kentucky, and Cincinnati, Ohio.  There has been plans to open stores in Chicago, Illinois, Cincinnati, Ohio, and Indianapolis, Indiana.

Factory tours are available weekdays by appointment, with group discounts available.  It is anticipated that, eventually, tours could make the factory as big a center for Louisville tourism as the Louisville Slugger Museum.

Product 

Clay used by the company comes from western Indiana, and may be up to 250 million years old.  Dishes made at the factory have been proven to be safe for use in ovens, microwave ovens, and dishwashers, and can retain heat for keeping food warm.

Cultural references 

Items from Louisville Stoneware are in the Smithsonian Institution and White House.  In addition, Queen Elizabeth II was presented a music box made by Louisville Stoneware, given by the wife of Kentucky's governor Ernie Fletcher, that played My Old Kentucky Home when the Queen visited Churchill Downs for the Kentucky Derby in 2007.

The New York Times singled out Louisville Stoneware as a business especially affected by the United Parcel Service strike of 1997.

During the U.S. presidential campaign of 2004, John Kerry gave a campaign speech on small-business healthcare insurance in May 2004 at Louisville Stoneware.

Gallery

See also
 List of attractions and events in the Louisville metropolitan area
 Hadley Pottery

References

External links
 Official site
 Hadley Pottery Official site

Tourist attractions in Louisville, Kentucky
Stoneware
Ceramics manufacturers of the United States
Manufacturing companies based in Louisville, Kentucky
Manufacturing companies established in 1815
1815 establishments in Kentucky
American companies established in 1815